Thomas Fleming may refer to:

Politicians and nobility
Thomas Fleming, Earl of Wigtown (died c. 1382), second person to hold the title earl of Wigtown
Thomas Fleming, 2nd Baron Slane (1358–1435), member of the Irish Parliament, 1394–1395
Thomas Fleming, 10th Baron Slane (died 1598), member of the Irish parliament of 1585
Thomas Fleming (died 1624) (1572–1624), English landowner and politician
Thomas Willis Fleming (1819–1890), English landed proprietor and Conservative MP
Tom Fleming (Irish politician) (born 1951), Independent Teachta Dála (TD) for Kerry South

Sportspeople
Tom Fleming (runner) (1951–2017), American runner
Tom Fleming (hurler) (1901–1960), Irish full-back hurler
Tommy Fleming (soccer) (1890–1965), Scottish American football (soccer) player
Tom Fleming (footballer) (1901–?), English football defender
Tom Fleming (baseball) (1873–1957), 19th-century baseball player
Tom Fleming (bowls), English lawn bower

Others
Sir Thomas Fleming (judge) (1544–1613), English judge
Thomas Fleming (bishop) (1593–1665), Irish Franciscan and Roman Catholic Archbishop of Dublin
Thomas Fleming (historian) (1927–2017), American historian and writer of historical fiction
Thomas Fleming (political writer) (born 1945), editor of Chronicles: A Magazine of American Culture
Thomas C. Fleming (1907–2006), American journalist
Thomas Fleming (flourmiller) (1848–1930), New Zealand flourmiller
Tom Fleming (actor) (1927–2010), Scottish actor and BBC commentator
Tom Fleming, bass player of the English band Wild Beasts
Tommy Fleming (musician) (born 1971), Irish singer
Tom Fleming (artist) (born 1966), artist

See also 
Thomas Flemming (born 1967), East German swimmer
Thomas Fleming House (disambiguation)
 Fleming (surname)